Yacine Zouaki (born 3 August 1980) is a Moroccan weightlifter. He competed in the men's featherweight event at the 2004 Summer Olympics.

References

1980 births
Living people
Moroccan male weightlifters
Olympic weightlifters of Morocco
Weightlifters at the 2004 Summer Olympics
Place of birth missing (living people)